Faridah Nakazibwe is a Ugandan journalist, who was appointed as Head of News at NTV Uganda, effective 31 March 2021. Replacing Josephine Karungi, who took up a job with the World Bank, as communications consultant.  Nakazibwe is also a Luganda news anchor  and a host of Mwasuze Mutya, a show that airs on Nation Television Uganda and Spark TV Uganda, a sister TV in Kampala, Uganda's capital and largest city.

Early life and education
Nakazibwe was born to the late Hajj Shakib Ssenyonjo and Hajat Sarah Ssenyonjo, in what is present-day Sembabule District. She is the second-born in a family of eight siblings.

She attended Kisozi Boarding Primary School, in Kisozi, Gomba District for her early primary education. When the land hosting her school was acquired by president Yoweri Museveni and converted into Kisozi Cattle Ranch, Faridah transferred to Bwala Primary School, in the town of Masaka, where she obtained her primary school leaving certificate. Later, her family relocated to Masaka town.

She studied at Taibah High School, in Kawempe, a neighborhood in Kampala, where she obtained her High School Diploma. She then went on to the Islamic University in Uganda, in Mbale, in the country's Eastern Region, graduating with a Bachelor of Mass Communication.

Career
Following the completion of her journalism degree, she was hired by the now defunct WBS Television as a reporter. Two years later, she transferred to NTV Uganda, where she was hired as the weekend news anchor of the evening Luganda telecast.

Family
Nakazibwe was married to Omar Ssali, a Ugandan employed in one of the Middle Eastern countries. They parted ways sometime in 2020.

She is the mother of two daughters, whose father is Engineer Dan Nankunda whom she met at the defunct WBS Television. For a period of less than one year, Nakazibwe had a temporary romantic relationship with Al Hajji Moses Kigongo, the vice chairperson of the ruling National Resistance Movement political party in Uganda. She ended that relationship sometime in 2015.

See also
Flavia Tumusiime
Josephine Karungi
 Sanyu Robinah Mweruka

References

External links
Day In The Life of A News Anchor, Faridah Nakazibwe

1984 births
Living people
Ganda people
Ugandan women journalists
People from Masaka District
People from Sembabule District
People from Central Region, Uganda
Islamic University in Uganda alumni
Ugandan women television journalists